Kilbreda College is an independent Roman Catholic secondary day school for girls, located in the Melbourne suburb of Mentone, Victoria, Australia. It was founded in 1904 by the Brigidine Sisters and is governed by Kildare Ministries.

Origins of the school building 

The original façade of the building was built by the Royal Coffee Palace Company Limited. It was opened in November 1887 and was known as the Mentone Coffee Palace. The Coffee Palace was the social centre of the town, situated on the corners of Mentone Parade, Florence Street and Como Parade. It is also near Mentone station (formerly known as Balcombe Road Station until 1884) and is surrounded by the local shops. In the 1890s due to competition with Mentone Hotel and the Depression, the Coffee Palace could no longer be run. In 1894 it fell into the hands of the Mercantile Bank of Australia, and the name of the building was changed to Como House. After this the Coffee Palace was only used occasionally for varying purposes. The Brigidine Sisters bought the Coffee Palace in mid-July 1904 for £2,050, considering the actual cost of the building and furniture, excluding land, was £25,500.

Related Schools 

Other schools governed by Kildare Ministries are:
Brigidine College (Indooroopilly) 
Brigidine College (St. Ives) 
Clonard College (Geelong) 
Kildare College (Holden Hill) 
Killester College (Springvale) 
Marian College (Ararat) 
Marian College (Sunshine West) 
St. Joseph’s College (Echuca) 
Star of the Sea College (Brighton)

Brigidine convent 
On 7 August 1904 the Brigidine Convent School was officially opened and blessed by Archbishop Thomas Carr, and classes began the next day.  On opening, the school had three pupils enrolled in their Convent School and 25 pupils enrolled in St. Patrick's Parish Primary which was located in the Church. The fee-paying  convent school  began taking boarders in 1905  and  subsequently  obtained registration  as  a  sub-primary, primary  and   secondary school. The  nuns   owned  a farm in nearby  Johnston  street  which  the  students  often  visited. Boarders and students of primary school age have been phased out;  the final primary class being in 1978. The  school  has been    single sex  (girls)  for  many  decades.  In the 1930s the school's name was changed to Kilbreda College, the name coming from the Gaelic Cill – church or community and Breda – Brigid. Therefore, Kilbreda means Church or Community of Saint Brigid.

Houses 
Tullow (red) 
Tullow is named after Tullow in the Republic of Ireland. This location was of special note to St. 
Brigid and the Brigidine Sisters.

Kildare (blue) 
Kildare is named after a county in Ireland which holds specials value to St. 
Brigid and the Brigidine Sisters.

Delany (yellow) 
Delany is named after Bishop Daniel Delany who helped and accompanied the Brigidine Sisters travel to Australia and set up some of the first Catholic school run in the Brigidine Tradition.

Brigid (green) 
Brigid was named after St. Brigid who was the inspiration behind the Brigidine sisters and therefore the School.

Principals 
The following individuals have served as College Principals:

Core values and symbols 

Most Brigidine schools follow the same core values, motto and school symbols.

The Brigidine Schools' symbols are:

 Brigid's Cross – The kind of cross St. Brigid used when teaching about the Catholic faith. It is made from woven reeds.
 The Oak Tree – St. Brigid's monastery in Tullow, is called Kildare. Kildare meaning 'the church of the oak'. Many Brigidine schools grow an oak tree from an acorn taken from one of the oak trees in Tullow.
 The Lamp of Learning – represents the light of Christian faith
 School Badge – was designed by the Irish College of Heraldry. The large cross of diamonds is taken from the badge of Bishop Daniel Delany, the bishop who founded the Brigidine Sisters in 1807. The middle diamond contains an image of the lamp of learning, and the image of St. Brigid's cross is contained in the top section.

Notable pupils 
 Catherine Arlove – three-time Olympian who competed at the 2008 Beijing, 2004 Athens and 2000 Sydney Olympics in judo
Simone De La Rue – Former dancer turned Hollywood fitness expert, and founder of Body By Simone dance based fitness studios
Noeleen Dix AM
 Maggie Fitzgibbon OAM – actress and singer
 Ann Henderson – Former Australian Politician
 Dr Bridie Kean – wheelchair basketball player, bronze medalist at the 2008 Summer Paralympics in Beijing, silver medalist at the 2012 Summer Paralympics in London
Judith Kinnear – the first woman to head a New Zealand university
 Tania Luiz –  Olympian who competed at the 2008 Beijing Olympics in badminton
Bree Munro – 2010 Winter Olympian who competed in freestyle skiing
Vikki Petraitis – author of crime novels
 The Honorable Marilyn Warren  – former chief justice of the Supreme Court of Victoria and former lieutenant governor of Victoria

See also 

 List of non-government schools in Victoria
 St. Brigid
 Victorian Certificate of Education
 Vocational Education and Training
 Victorian Certificate of Applied Learning

References

Further reading

External links

 

Educational institutions established in 1904
Rock Eisteddfod Challenge participants
Girls' schools in Victoria (Australia)
Catholic secondary schools in Melbourne
Brigidine schools
Convents in Australia
1904 establishments in Australia
Alliance of Girls' Schools Australasia
Buildings and structures in the City of Kingston (Victoria)